The 1966 Argentine Primera División was the 75th season of top-flight football in Argentina. The season began on March 6 and ended on December 6.

Racing Club won the championship (15th title) with no teams relegated.

League standings

References

Argentine Primera División seasons
Argentine Primera Division
1